Maha Manikya (died 1431), also known as Chhengthung Fa, was the Maharaja of Tripura from about 1400 to 1431. Contrary to narratives provided by early histories, evidence indicates that Maha Manikya was the founder of the kingdom, having established dominance over neighbouring tribes in the early 15th century. He is further thought to be the first holder of the title "Manikya", taken in recognition of a historic victory over the neighbouring Bengal Sultanate. The dynasty which he founded continued using the title until Tripura's merger with India in 1949.

Chronology and name
Maha Manikya is estimated to have reigned from about 1400 until 1431. The Rajmala, the royal chronicle of Tripura, contains little information regarding his life. There, he is described as the son of Mukut Manikya, himself the son of the dynasty's supposed founder, Ratna Manikya I, a descendant of the mythological Lunar dynasty. Upon ascending the throne, Maha is said to have proved himself a virtuous ruler and distinguished scholar, with no mention of any military engagements during his reign. There are notable reasons to be doubtful of the narrative provided by the Rajmala however. Numismatic evidence proves that Maha could not have been the son of Mukut, given that the latter had only begun his rule in 1489. It is further believed that it was in fact Maha who had founded the dynasty and be the first to possess the Manikya cognomen, rather than Ratna Manikya, who evidence shows had actually reigned over thirty years after the former's death.

Given that his son Dharma Manikya I is identified with the ruler named in the Rajmala as "Dangar Fa", it is judged that Maha can be equated with the latter's predecessor in the text: "Chhengthung Fa". This was likely what he was originally called, given that "Maha Manikya" (literally meaning "Great Manikya") would be a very unusual personal name, especially considering that "Maha" is merely a prefix which is meaningless as a given name.

Reign
It is believed that Chhengthung Fa (later Maha Manikya) was a Tripuri chief who had established the Tripura kingdom in the early 15th century by subjugating neighbouring tribes, namely the Kukis, Jamatias and Reangs among others. This was possible due to the Tripuri having the largest tribal population as well as its inhabitancy of the productive and fertile valleys bordering Bengal, lying between Sylhet and Chittagong. These events are believed to have occurred around the time that Raja Ganesha had established temporary sovereignty over Bengal, when the influence of its Sultan was weak.

According to the Rajmala, Chhengthung Fa later incurred the wrath of an unidentified ruler of Bengal when a man bearing a gift for the Sultan was robbed while passing through Tripura. When he learned that a large army was dispatched against him, Chhengthung Fa was prepared to sue for peace but was prevented from doing so by his queen, Tripura Sundari. She declared submission to be an act of cowardice and convinced her husband to fight, taking command of the soldiers herself and leading them to victory over Bengal. It is likely that it was as a result of this impressive triumph that Chhengthung Fa took the title "Maha Manikya", with the "Manikya" suffix being subsequently inherited by his successors. However, due to the similarity between the coins of Sultan Jalaluddin Muhammad Shah and that of a later Tripura ruler, it has been suggested that some part (or perhaps temporarily, the entirety) of the kingdom had submitted to Bengal during Maha's reign, though this is disputed among historians.

Maha died in 1431 and following a brief struggle among his children and generals, he was succeeded by his eldest son Dharma Manikya I. The descendants of another son, Gagan Fa, inherited the throne in later centuries, beginning with Kalyan Manikya in 1626.

Notes

References

Bibliography

 

Kings of Tripura
History of Tripura
1431 deaths